Togo is a ghost town in Graham County, Kansas, United States.

History
Togo was issued a post office in 1905. The post office was discontinued in 1910. The population in 1910 was 20.

References

Further reading

External links
 Graham County maps: Current, Historic, KDOT

Former populated places in Graham County, Kansas
Former populated places in Kansas